In probability theory, a birth process or a pure birth process is a special case of a continuous-time Markov process and a generalisation of a Poisson process. It defines a continuous process which takes values in the natural numbers and can only increase by one (a "birth") or remain unchanged. This is a type of birth–death process with no deaths. The rate at which births occur is given by an exponential random variable whose parameter depends only on the current value of the process

Definition

Birth rates definition
A birth process with birth rates  and initial value  is a minimal right-continuous process  such that  and the interarrival times  are independent exponential random variables with parameter .

Infinitesimal definition
A birth process with rates  and initial value  is a process  such that:
 
 
 
 
  is independent of 

(The third and fourth conditions use little o notation.)

Continuous-time Markov chain definition
A birth process can be defined as a continuous-time Markov process (CTMC)  with the non-zero Q-matrix entries  and initial distribution  (the random variable which takes value  with probability 1).

Variations
Some authors require that a birth process start from 0 i.e. that , while others allow the initial value to be given by a probability distribution on the natural numbers. The state space can include infinity, in the case of an explosive birth process. The birth rates are also called intensities.

Properties
As for CTMCs, a birth process has the Markov property. The CTMC definitions for communicating classes, irreducibility and so on apply to birth processes. By the conditions for recurrence and transience of a birth–death process, any birth process is transient. The transition matrices  of a birth process satisfy the Kolmogorov forward and backward equations.

The backwards equations are:
 (for )

The forward equations are:
 (for )
 (for )

From the forward equations it follows that:
 (for )
 (for )

Unlike a Poisson process, a birth process may have infinitely many births in a finite amount of time. We define  and say that a birth process explodes if  is finite. If  then the process is explosive with probability 1; otherwise, it is non-explosive with probability 1 ("honest").

Examples

Simple birth process

A simple birth process is a birth process with rates . It models a population in which each individual gives birth repeatedly and independently at rate . Udny Yule studied the processes, so they may be known as Yule processes.

The number of births in time  from a simple birth process of population  is given by:

For the special case , this is the geometric distribution with success rate .

The expectation of the process grows exponentially; specifically, if  then .

A simple birth process with immigration is a modification of this process with rates . This models a population with births by each population member in addition to a constant rate of immigration into the system.

Notes

References
 
 
 
 
 

Markov processes
Poisson point processes